A crown of sonnets or sonnet corona is a sequence of sonnets, usually addressed to one person, and/or concerned with a single theme. Each of the sonnets explores one aspect of the theme, and is linked to the preceding and succeeding sonnets by repeating the final line of the preceding sonnet as its first line.  The first line of the first sonnet is repeated as the final line of the final sonnet, thereby bringing the sequence to a close.

Heroic crown

An advanced form of crown of sonnets is also called a sonnet redoublé or heroic crown, comprising fifteen sonnets, in which the sonnets are linked as described above, but the final binding sonnet is made up of all the first or the last lines of the preceding fourteen, in order. The fifteenth sonnet is called the Mastersonnet. This form was invented by the Siena Academy, which was formed in 1460, but there are no existing crowns of sonnets written by them. The form was first described by Giovanni Mario Crescimbeni in his work L'Istoria della volgar poesia (History of Vernacular Poetry), published in Venice, 1731 and later by P.G. Bisso in his Introduzione alla volgar poesia (Introduction to Vernacular Poetry), published in Venice, 1794. A variation on the form is sometimes used in which the binding sonnet is the first sonnet, and subsequent sonnets end with a line taken from it in order. The oldest complete crown which survived time was published in 1748. It was written by a group of 14 poets to celebrate the birth of the ideal woman: Corona di rime per festeggiare il natalizio giorno di fille.

John Donne wrote La corona, a set of 7 sonnets which are linked together. Because there are only 7 of them and because there's no Mastersonnet, La corona is not a full heroic crown. Probably the first full crown of sonnets in English is Lady Mary Wroth's A Crown of Sonnets Dedicated to Love which is from circa 1620.

The children's book A Wreath for Emmett Till by Marilyn Nelson also follows the form of a heroic crown of sonnets.  Another well-known and frequent author of contemporary crowns of sonnets is Marilyn Hacker. "Intertidal", a collaborative crown of sonnets by contemporary poets Judith Barrington, Annie Finch, Julie Kane, Julia Lisella, D'Arcy Randall, Kathrine Varnes, and Lesley Wheeler, was organized through discussion on the Wom-Po listserv and published in 2007. The form is used frequently by Tyehimba Jess, both in his first book Leadbelly, and multiple times in his Pulitzer-prize winning collection Olio, which is structured around a heroic crown of persona poems in the voices of the original Fisk Jubilee Singers.

21st Century crowns in English are e.g. by Linda Bierds, Andrea Carter Brown, Robert Darling, Moira Egan, Jenny Factor, Andrei Krylov, Rachael Briggs, Julie Fay, Constance Merritt, Julie Sophia Paegle, Marie Ponsot, Patricia Smith, Marilyn Taylor, Natasha Trethewey, David Trinidad, John Murillo, John McDonough, Kathrine Varnes, Angela Alaimo O'Donnell, Laurie Ann Guerrero, Cindy Tran, and Robert Luis Rodriguez. Fiona Chamness's heroic crown Choreography for Ensemble won the 2014 Beloit Poetry Prize.

A Wreath of Sonnets is the oldest Slovenian crown of sonnets, written by the Romantic poet France Prešeren. It was written in 1833 and was enriched with acrostic in the master sonnet. Prešeren's crown of sonnets was translated into Russian in 1889, which had great influence on many poets, including Valery Bryusov. Jaroslav Seifert wrote his sentimental Věnec sonetů (A Wreath of Sonnets) in this form about Prague, with an authorized translation by Jan Křesadlo, who also composed his own emigre riposte in the same format, as well as writing several other sonnet cycles. The poet Venko Markovski wrote and published more than 100 crowns of sonnets, which also contained acrostics dedicated to various historical figures.

The oldest Dutch crown of sonnets is written by H.Th. Boelen in 1876: 'Saffo-fantasie', published in a journal for theatre. The second Dutch crown is by Eliza Laurillard: 'Der bloemen lof', published in his book Bloemen en knoppen from 1878. Jeanne Reyneke van Stuwe wrote the third Dutch crown, her book Impressies (1898) opens with a crown. In the 20st and 21st Century the crown became a regular form of poetry in Dutch literature, with authors like Frédéric Bastet, Ilja Leonard Pfeijffer, Frank van Pamelen, Wouter Ydema, and O.B. Kunst.

Heroic crown of crowns
In 1828 the German poet Ludwig Bechstein published Sonettenkränze. This book consists of 14 crowns of sonnets. Alas Bechstein did not think about linking the 14 Mastersonnets together to make a new crown. A crown of crowns consists of 14 crowns of which the mastersonnets form a crown on their own. Those 14 Mastersonnets generate a 15th sonnet by their first or last lines, that 15th sonnet is called the Grandmastersonnet. A crown of crowns consists thus of 196 linked sonnets which generate 14 Mastersonnets which generate 1 Grandmastersonnet; this leads to a total of 211 sonnets.

Bas Jongenelen and Martijn Neggers claimed to have written the first crown of crowns of sonnets in 2016: Een kruisweg van alledaags leed. 14 crowns made 14 Mastersonnets. These Mastersonnets are a crown on their own, generating another Mastersonnet, which is called the Grandmastersonnet. But their claim is false. The first crown of crowns ever was written by Mitja Šarabon in Slovenia in 1971: Sonetni venec sonetnih vencev. Een kruisweg van alledaags leed was the first crown of crowns in Dutch literature, other Dutch crown of crowns are e.g. Dichter bij het eind,  't Is egoïstisch, maar 't is mooi geweest, Ik maak er gauw een eind aan, en ik kom, Met rasse schreden naar het laatste feest, and Zo feestend leef ik naar het einde toe by Olax. Evi Aarens is, after Olax, the second individual poet who wrote a Dutch crown of crowns. In 2021 she published Disoriëntaties, a crown of crowns about the history of mankind.

The first crown of crowns was from Slovenia, more Slovenian poets wrote crowns of crowns. From 1994 dates Sla sponina by Janko Moder. Milan Batista published in 1998 Veliki sonetni venec, and Valentin Cundrič published in the same year 8 crowns of crowns, one of those is Pamtivid (which can also be found online). The other 7 crowns of crowns are published in his book Slovenska knjiga mrtvih. 2 of those are also published on the Internet: Molitvenik peščeni en Terjatve. The crowns of crowns by Cundrič doesn't have Master- and Grandmastersonnets, it is up to the reader to puzzle them together.

Russian literature has also a tradition on crowns of crowns. Vladimir Germanovich Vasilyev wrote in 1987 his Мир, but he wasn’t able to publish it as a book, in 2016 he published it online. Anatoly Martynov published in 1996 Благовест. In 2007, the Russian poet Natalia Shamberova published "The Mists of August", a wreath of wreaths: 211 interlacing sonnets composed of 14 wreaths of sonnets to form the wreath of magistrals, and a final sonnet called the magistrals' magistral. In 2010 came Arkady Alferov with Корона венков сонетов and in 2011 Sergey Don Тебе, мой город, and Elin Grigory Yakovlevich Колокол Герцелойды, Izyaslav Kotlyarov published in 2001 Земля простит, но не прощает небо and in 2015 Ещё за далью и за высотой uit. Not every crown of crown has a known year of publication. Vladimir Ostapenko’s two crowns of crowns Отшельник and Монолог for example. Or Корона жизни – Око by Leo Himmelsohn. Also Mark Polykovsky’s Волшебство сна is undated, just as Метаморфозы by Sluka Alexander Yaroslavovich, Мировоззре́ние Ми́стика by Igor Morozov, При све́те – Не уснуть van Ananyin Valery Zosimovich, and Моя Мифологики by Alexander Chetverkin.

Belarus knows several crowns of crowns: in 2015 Sophia Nikolaevna Shah published Мару стаць я мастаком. Special about the crown of crowns is that it's a children's book. Shah also published the crown of crowns Адухаўленне (2000), Прысвячэнне (2001), Прызначэнне (2002),  Увасабленне (2003), Спасціжэнне (2004), Азарычы (2007) en Каб тое выказаць… (2015).

The first crown of crowns outside Europe was published in Brazil by the poet Paulo Camelo in 2002: Coroas de uma coroa (Crowns of a crown). He also published in 2020 Mulheres, mulheres. Joedson Adriano da Silva Santos is also a Brasilian poet of crown of crowns, his Alcides is about Hercules, and published as a poster. In his later published book Alcides he published three complete crowns of crowns: 'Teoria e Práxis', 'Parerga e Paralipomena' and 'Dodecatlo'. This last crown of crowns is the same as Alcides on the poster.

In English literature John Patrick McDonough's Heroic Crown of Heroic Crowns was said to be published in 2020. In 2021 Daniel Ståhl published Requiem - In memory of all that should have been. It claims to be a heroic crown of crowns: 14 crowns of which the Mastersonnets form a new crown. But the sonnets are not linked together, Ståhl's crowns consists of 14 individual sonnets which are not woven together, the Mastersonnet is made of the first lines of the 14 sonnets before it. So Requiem is not a fully real crown of crowns. This technique looks like the one which the Slovenian poet Anton Gričnik used in 2005 in his Hvalnica Življenju. This book has 14 crowns, but they form not a strict interwoven 15th crown, because the 14 Mastersonnets are not linked together. Still that 15th crown generates a Grandmastersonnet, so the total of sonnets is 211.

Bas Jongenelen published on 2021-09-14 on neerlandistiek.nl (a scholarly website for Dutch language and literature) an Excel sheet to make a crown of crowns:
https://neerlandistiek.nl/wp-content/uploads/2021/09/KRANSENKRANS-LEEG-top-down.xlsx First you write and fill in the Grandmastersonnet; the lines of which jump to the 14 Mastersonnets. If you write the 14 Mastersonnets, the lines jump to the 196 individual sonnets.

See also
Sonnet cycle

Sources

Sonnet studies

ja:ソネット#crown of sonnets